Camp Bird is an unincorporated community in Ouray County, Colorado, United States. It lies between the present towns of Ouray and Telluride. Camp Bird is west of Thistledown and reached by CO Road 361 (Camp Bird Road).

History

Mining era
The town was famous for Camp Bird Mine.

Modern day
Today it is an unincorporated community, though it maintains a very small populace.

See also
Communities of Ouray County

References

External links
 Camp Bird Ghost Town Profile

Unincorporated communities in Ouray County, Colorado
Unincorporated communities in Colorado